Listed below are the colleges or universities with the most NCAA Division I-sanctioned team championships, individual championships, and combined team and individual championships, as documented by information published on official NCAA websites.  Excluded from this list are all national championships earned outside the scope of NCAA competition, including Division I FBS football titles, women's AIAW championships, men's rowing, equestrian titles, and retroactive Helms title nominations.

NCAA Division I Team Championships 

Totals are per NCAA annual list published every July and NCAA published gymnastics history, with subsequent results as of May 30, 2022, obtained from NCAA.org, which provides intermittent updates throughout the year. For details on championships, click on a school's nickname and then open up its Championships section.

† Co-ed sports include fencing (since 1990), rifle, and skiing (since 1983). Fencing championships before 1990 and skiing championships before 1983 were awarded as men's or women's championships and are counted here as such.

Combined NCAA Division I Team and Individual Championships 
The following table lists the top eleven NCAA schools with the most combined NCAA Division I Team and Individual Championships.

See also
List of NCAA schools with the most Division I national championships
List of NCAA schools with the most AIAW Division I national championships
NACDA Directors' Cup

References

 
Schools